Shorea iliasii (also called yellow meranti) is a tree in the family Dipterocarpaceae. It is endemic to Borneo.

Sources

iliasii
Endemic flora of Borneo
Trees of Borneo
Taxonomy articles created by Polbot